"Yes/No" is a song by Nigerian singer Banky W. It was released as the lead single from his fifth studio album, R&BW (2013). The song was produced by Cobhams Asuquo. It peaked at number 1 on BBC Radio 1Xtra's Afrobeat chart.

Music video
The accompanying music video for "Yes/No" was shot in Lagos, Nigeria, by Banky W and Clarence Peters. British-Nigerian model Angela Tokunbo Daniel played Banky W's love interest in the music video.

Accolades
The music video for "Yes/No" won Most Gifted R&B Video at the 10th Annual Channel O Music Video Awards, which was held at the Walter Sisulu Square in Kliptown, Soweto on November 30, 2013. "Yes/No" earned Banky W a nomination in the Best Male Vocal Performance category at The Headies 2013.

Track listing
 Digital single

Release history

References

2012 songs
2012 singles
Banky W. songs